Sexual life may refer to:
  Human sexual activity
 Sexual Life, a 2005 comedy-drama film